The 1930 Cork Junior Hurling Championship was the 34th staging of the Cork Junior Hurling Championship since its establishment by the Cork County Board.

On 21 December 1930, Ballyhea won the championship following a 3–01 to 0–02 defeat of Kinsale in the final at the Cork Athletic Grounds. It was their first ever championship title.

References

Cork Junior Hurling Championship
Cork Junior Hurling Championship